Garnich is a commune and small town in southwestern Luxembourg. It is part of the canton of Capellen.

, the town of Garnich, which lies in the east of the commune, has a population of 1202.  Other towns within the commune include Dahlem (population 2014: 400), Hivange (population 2014: 118), and Kahler (population 2014: 277) for a total population of 1997 in 2014 in the commune. Amongst these, 1454 are of Luxembourish nationality (72,81%) and 543 (27,19%) are of other nationality.

Population

See also
 List of mayors of Garnich

References

External links
 

 
Communes in Capellen (canton)
Towns in Luxembourg